The Electoral district of Upper Yarra was a Lower House electoral district of the Parliament of the Australian state of Victoria.

The district included (among others) the Dandenongs, Mulgrave, Baywater and Warburton, but was abolished in 1945.

Members for Upper Yarra

After Upper Yarra was abolished, George Knox went on to represent the newly created Electoral district of Scoresby from 1945.

Election results

References

Former electoral districts of Victoria (Australia)
1927 establishments in Australia
1945 disestablishments in Australia